Naseer Shaukat (born 24  January 1966) is a Pakistani professional cricketer who played for The Hills Cricket Club.

References

1966 births
Living people
Faisalabad cricketers
Water and Power Development Authority cricketers
Ireland cricketers
Cricketers from Faisalabad
Place of birth missing (living people)